In computer technology, read-only can refer to:

 Read-only memory (ROM), a type of storage media
 Read-only access to memory using memory protection
 Read-only access to files or directories in file system permissions
 Read-only access for database administrators in database system permissions